Ballera gas plant is a natural-gas processing facility in the locality of Durham in the southwestern Queensland, Australia. It is operated by Santos Limited.

The gas plant processes gas from approximately 130 wells in 45 gas fields in the Eromanga Basin. Processed gas is transmitted via the 755 km South West Queensland Pipeline to the trading hub at Wallumbilla (east of Roma) in southeastern Queensland, via the QSN Link extension of that pipeline to Moomba (180 km southwest, in northeastern South Australia) and via the Carpentaria Gas Pipeline to Mount Isa (800 km north). It is served by the Ballera Airport as workers fly in and out. Crude oil is not processed at Ballera, but at Jackson, 65 km southeast.

The Ballera gas plant is operated by Santos Limited which is slightly over 60% owner of the facility. The other joint owners are Beach Energy and Origin Energy.

The plant was established in 1991, but gas needed further processing at Moomba. It was upgraded in 1997 and 2003.

References

Fuels infrastructure in Australia
Natural gas plants
Energy in Queensland